Marion is a 1920 Italian silent film directed by Roberto Roberti and starring Francesca Bertini.

Cast
 Francesca Bertini 
 Giorgio Bonaiti 
 Gina Cinquini 
 Mary Fleuron 
 Mario Parpagnoli

References

Bibliography
 Cristina Jandelli. Le dive italiane del cinema muto. L'epos, 2006.

External links

1920 films
1920s Italian-language films
Films directed by Roberto Roberti
Italian silent films
Italian black-and-white films